William Van Dijck (born 24 January 1961) is a Belgian former athlete, primarily active on the 3000m steeplechase.

Biography
Van Dijck was born in Leuven.  He was the first Belgian to win a medal at the World Championships, winning the bronze medal at the 1987 World Championships. He won a second bronze at the 1994 European Championships. He became Belgian Sportsman of the year in 1986. Van Dijck quit athletics in 1997 and now works in a bank in Geel.

He also applied himself to cross country running and won the Lotto Cross Cup in the 1993–94 and 1995–96 seasons.

Achievements
 All results regarding 3000 metres steeplechase 

 1986: Belgian record in Brussels: 8:10.01, the best year performance worldwide
 1986: National Trophy for Sporting Achievements

Van Dijck was 9 times Belgian Champion steeplechaser between 1983 and 1994.

References

External links

1961 births
Living people
Sportspeople from Leuven
Flemish sportspeople
Belgian male steeplechase runners
Athletes (track and field) at the 1984 Summer Olympics
Athletes (track and field) at the 1988 Summer Olympics
Athletes (track and field) at the 1992 Summer Olympics
Olympic athletes of Belgium
World Athletics Championships athletes for Belgium
World Athletics Championships medalists
European Athletics Championships medalists